Gipsy.cz is a Czech Romani hip hop group. They performed at the Glastonbury Festival in 2007 and represented their country at the Eurovision Song Contest 2009 in Moscow, with the song "Aven Romale". The band plays a combination of hip hop and traditional Romani music, sung primarily in the Romani language, with some lyrics in Czech and English. As of 2013, they have released four studio albums.

History

Beginnings; Romano Hip Hop: 2004–2008
In 2004, rapper Radovan "Radek" Banga released the solo album Ya favourite Cd Rom and later met violinist Vojta Lavička and brothers Jan (upright bass) and Petr Surmaj (guitar and accordion), with whom he formed the group Gipsy.cz. They rose to fame in 2006 with the single "Romano Hip Hop", from the album of the same name, which reached the MTV World Chart Express and was later certified Gold in the Czech Republic. Also in 2006, the band won Discovery of the Year at the Anděl Awards.

In 2007, they took part in the Czech preliminary round for the Eurovision Song Contest with the song "Muloland", but only reached second place. Later that year, Gipsy.cz was the first Czech group to perform at the Glastonbury Festival. Additionally, their song "Jednou" was included on the Gypsy Groove compilation album published by Putumayo in 2007.

At the 2008 Český slavík, they won the Rising Star of the Year award.

Reprezent, Desperado, Upgrade: 2008–2013
In June 2008, Gipsy.cz released their second studio album, Reprezent. It reached second place on the World Music Chart in Europe, remaining there for four weeks. The song "A na závěr si s námi dejte trochu té Čunárny" stimulated discussion, as the title and lyrics mocked politician Jiří Čunek, who is known for his anti-Roma comments. In order to avoid a possible lawsuit, Gipsy.cz eventually released an alternate version of the song, without the offending lyrics.

The band took part in the Czech preliminary round for the Eurovision Song Contest in 2008, but again failed to qualify.

Jan and Petr Surmaj left Gipsy.cz in January 2009, and after filling out the vacant musical seats, the band finally succeeded in their repeated attempts to represent the Czech Republic at the Eurovision Song Contest in Moscow, Russia, with their song "Aven Romale". They finished last in the first semi-final, without receiving a single point.

In February and March 2011, Gipsy.cz toured Australia as part of the Karavan Festival. In April of the same year, their third studio album, Desperado, was released. Two years later, the band issued their fourth record, Upgrade.

Band members

Current
 Radoslav Banga aka Gipsy – vocals
 Tomáš Baroš – electric upright bass
 Jan Sochor – accordion
 Viliam Didiáš – violin

Past
 Vojta Lavička – violin, vocals
 Noemi Fialová – violin, vocals
 Tibor Žida – guitar, vocals
 Matěj Černý – bass
 Oliver Lipenský – drums
 Petr Surmaj – guitar, accordion
 Jan Surmaj – electric upright bass

Discography
 Romano Hip Hop (2006)
 Reprezent (2008)
 Desperado (2011)
 Upgrade (2013)

Awards
 2005 Anděl Awards
 Best Hip Hop Album nomination
 2006 Anděl Awards
 Best Album in the World nomination
 Best New Artist nomination (won)

References

External links

 
 Gipsy.cz on Indies Scope
 Documentary about Gipsy.cz on Czech Television

Musical groups established in 2004
Romani rappers
Czech hip hop groups
Romani musical groups
Indian musical groups
Czech Romani people
Eurovision Song Contest entrants of 2009
Eurovision Song Contest entrants for the Czech Republic
Romani-language bands